Fulton is a town in Hempstead County, Arkansas, United States. The population was 201 at the 2010 census. It is part of the Hope Micropolitan Statistical Area. The community is named after steamboat inventor Robert Fulton.

Geography
Fulton is located at  (33.611984, -93.814471). Fulton is located at the junction of Arkansas Highway 355 and Interstate 30 and lies on the north bank of the Red River of the South.

Demographics

As of the census of 2000, there were 245 people, 95 households, and 68 families residing in the city. The racial makeup of the city was 55.92% White, 43.27% Black or African American, 0.41% Native American, and 0.41% from two or more races. 1.63% of the population were Hispanic or Latino of any race.

There were 95 households, out of which 32.6% had children under the age of 18 living with them, 53.7% were married couples living together, 17.9% had a female householder with no husband present, and 27.4% were non-families. 25.3% of all households were made up of individuals, and 14.7% had someone living alone who was 65 years of age or older. The average household size was 2.58 and the average family size was 3.04.

In the city the population was spread out, with 25.7% under the age of 18, 14.3% from 18 to 24, 17.1% from 25 to 44, 28.6% from 45 to 64, and 14.3% who were 65 years of age or older. The median age was 39 years. For every 100 females, there were 100.8 males. For every 100 females age 18 and over, there were 85.7 males.

The median income for a household in the city was $24,583, and the median income for a family was $29,167. Males had a median income of $21,827 versus $17,656 for females. The per capita income for the city was $11,280. About 20.0% of families and 18.8% of the population were below the poverty line, including 27.1% of those under the age of eighteen and 18.2% of those 65 or over.

Education
It is within the Hope School District. It operates Hope High School.

Notable people
Robert Shaw, Illinois politician, was born in Futon
William Shaw, Illinois state legislator, was born in Fulton.

See also

List of cities and towns in Arkansas

References

Further reading

External links

Hope micropolitan area
Towns in Arkansas
Towns in Hempstead County, Arkansas